Pep (stylized as PƎP) is the fifth studio album by Canadian singer-songwriter Lights. It was released on April 1, 2022, on Fueled by Ramen and is her first studio album under the label (not counting Skin & Earth Acoustic). Like her previous album, Skin & Earth, the album was accompanied by a comic, titled The Clinic, which is a side story to the Skin & Earth comic.

The album debuted at number 32 on the Canadian Albums Chart, being her first album not to break the top 10, as well as her first album to not enter the Billboard 200, but it did peak at number 25 on the Top Album Sales chart.

Background 
In an interview with AltPress, Lights stated she started writing the songs around 2019, but once the COVID-19 pandemic struck, she wanted the album to be more positive, which was inspired by her mental health worsening during that time. Because it was her first album released through Fueled by Ramen, she revealed being on the label influenced her to make the album with less of a pop sound like her previous albums and have more of a rock and alt style.

Lights said tying this album in with a comic book was because she wanted to continue the story of Skin & Earth, which she claimed was still not finished. When talking about The Clinic, she claimed the comic is "a metaphor for music. We use music to get away, to escape from our realities. The Clinic is a big metaphor for an album."

Promotion 
Lights released the single "Prodigal Daughter" on October 20, 2021, along with the first part of an accompanying comic book, The Clinic, which is a side story to her previous comic Skin & Earth. Not too long after, she announced the Baby I'm Back tour in North America. The second single, "Real Thing", which featured Los Angeles-based musician Elohim, was released on December 24, 2021. On February 4, 2022, the third single, "Salt and Vinegar", was released as well as the official announcement of the album. On March 17, 2022, the fourth and final single, "In My Head", featuring Twenty One Pilots drummer Josh Dun, was released.

Reception 

AllMusic rated the album 4.5 stars, writing "Lights has leveled up, delivering a potent, lyrically mature, and musically colorful production that balances her empowered feminism with a sleek, take-no-prisoners pop aesthetic."

Track listing

Charts

References 

2022 albums
Lights (musician) albums
Fueled by Ramen albums